The Cicârlău is a right tributary of the river Someș in Romania. It discharges into the Someș in the village Ilba.

References

Rivers of Romania
Rivers of Maramureș County